John Colborne Milligan (1867 – 1941) was an Ontario lawyer, judge and political figure. He represented Stormont in the Legislative Assembly of Ontario from 1911 to 1914 and 1923 to 1926 as a Conservative member.

He was born on a farm near Newington, Ontario, the son of William Milligan, an Irish immigrant. He taught school and then attended the University of Toronto and Osgoode Hall. He was called to the bar in 1899 and set up practice in Cornwall. Milligan served on the high school board, was a police magistrate and then juvenile court judge. In 1928, he was named King's Counsel. Milligan married Maud Percival.

External links 

Stormont, Dundas and Glengarry : a history, 1784-1945, JG Harkness (1946)

1867 births
1941 deaths
People from the United Counties of Stormont, Dundas and Glengarry
Progressive Conservative Party of Ontario MPPs